Billy Brick is a hurler from County Kerry, Ireland.

External links
 Picture - Billy Brick, Kerry, in action against Mark Brennan, Carlow. Christy Ring Cup Semi-Final, Carlow v Kerry, Dr. Cullen Park, Carlow. Credit: Matt Browne / SPORTSFILE
 Picture - 5 May 2003; Billy Brick, Kerry. Allianz National Hurling League Division 2 Final, Antrim v Kerry, Croke Park, Dublin. Hurling. Credit; Ray McManus / SPORTSFILE

Kerry inter-county hurlers
Munster inter-provincial hurlers
Kilmoyley hurlers
Living people
Year of birth missing (living people)